Minuscule 805 (in the Gregory-Aland numbering), ε2050 (von Soden), is a Greek minuscule manuscript of the New Testament written on parchment. Palaeographically it has been assigned to the 13th century. The manuscript is lacunose.

Description 
The codex contains the text of the three first Gospels, on 244 parchment leaves (size ), with some lacunae. It lacks: Matthew 1:1-9; 3:16-5:46; 11:7-12:48; 13:25-26:31; 27:58-28:20; Mark 7:21-30; Luke 1:1-9.47-79; 7:31-8:16; 8:29-24:53. Matthew 14:29-15:4 was supplied by a later hand.

The text is written in one column per page, 22 lines per page.

Text 
Kurt Aland the Greek text of the codex did not place in any Category.

It was not examined according to the Claremont Profile Method.

History 
According to Gregory the manuscript was written in the 13th century. The manuscript is currently dated by the INTF to the 13th century.

It was added to the list of New Testament manuscripts by Gregory (805e). Gregory saw the manuscript in 1886.

The manuscript is now housed at the library of the Hellenic Parliament (351) in Athens.

See also 

 List of New Testament minuscules
 Textual criticism
 Minuscule 804

References

Further reading 

 

Greek New Testament minuscules
13th-century biblical manuscripts